Dirigo High School is a high school located in Dixfield, Maine, in the United States as part of Maine Regional School Unit 56. Dirigo High School serves the towns of Dixfield, Canton, Carthage and Peru. It is classified as a secondary class C school. The school is in the Mountain Valley Athletic Conference or MVC.

Dirigo High School was built in 1948, by William Morris, as Dixfield High School. The second floor was added in 1951, the gym was added in 1967 and the science wing was added in 1974. The building was renovated and expanded in 1998.

Girls' basketball

The Dirigo Lady Cougars' basketball team has had over a decade of success. Since 1995 the Lady Cougars had 11 straight Mountain Valley Conference (MVC) titles for a total of 12, 11 straight Western Maine titles for a total of 14, and 6 out of 13 State Championships. Dirigo has been a dominant high school basketball team in the past decade. The Lady Cougars rely on a great defense, and love to trap opposing teams and run a fast-break offense. The Lady Cougars have been gifted with several players to make the 1,000-point club.

1995-MVC Champs, Western Maine Champs, State Runners-up
1996-MVC Champs, Western Maine Champs, State Champs
1997-MVC Champs, Western Maine Champs, State Runners-up
1998-MVC Champs, Western Maine Champs, State Champs
1999-MVC Champs, Western Maine Champs, State Runners-up
2000-MVC Champs, Western Maine Champs, State Champs
2001-MVC Champs, Western Maine Champs, State Runners-u
2002-MVC Champs, Western Maine Champs, State Champs
2003-MVC Champs, Western Maine Champs, State Champs
2004-MVC Champs, Western Maine Champs, State Runners-up
2005-MVC Champs, Western Maine Champs, State Champs
2007-MVC Champs, Western Maine Runners-Up
2005- Western Maine Champs
2000- Western Maine Champs
1985- Western Maine Champs, State Runners-up
1979- MVC Champs
1978- MVC Champs, Western Maine Champs, State Champs
1977- MVC Champs, Western Maine Champs, State Champs
1976- Western Maine Champions

Cheering

Cheering is a winter sport. Dirigo has won an athletic award in 1998 and 2002. In 2007, DHS won regionals, and won a Western Maine  Class C championship. In 2010, The cheerleading team won second place at the regional championship, and was named Runner-up.

Soccer

The Dirigo high school soccer team has made it to the Maine state semifinals twice. In the past five years  they have also made it to the Western Maine Finals, but they lost to Sacopee Valley 2-1. In 2007, they made it to the semi final round with a record of 11-2-1 in the regular season and an overall record was 12-3-1. This team was the third team in Dirigo history to make it this far into the playoffs. In 2009, the Dirigo boys' team set a school record for best regular season record at 12-0-2. They lost the Mountain Valley Conference Championship game to St. Dominics. They lost in the Quarter Finals of the playoffs to North Yarmouth Academy. The Dirigo girls' team also made the playoffs, but lost in the quarter finals during the fifth round of penalty shots against a heavily favored Georges Valley team. In 2010, the Dirigo boys were projected to have a down season (Some critics had predicted the team to have a record as low as 4-10-0) after losing many alumni, despite the ill odds the boys went 10-2-2 making the MVC Championship game, and the playoffs for the second straight year. The Cougars lost the Mountain Valley Championship game to a heavily favored Wiscasset team in the final minutes after holding an early lead. The Cougars were eliminated from the playoffs in the quarter finals by Hall Dale High School by a score of 3-1. The Dirigo girls made the playoffs again for the second year in a row, but lost in the second round of penalty shots to Old Orchard Beach.

For the Boys' soccer homecoming game, it is tradition to run out onto the field wearing orange hunting gear, and to play the game while wearing orange soccer socks. This tradition faded after Dirigo replaced their head coach during the 2010 season.

Boys' varsity soccer is currently coached by Jack Rioux, and JV by Owen Libby.
Girls' varsity soccer is coached by teacher Art Chamberlain and JV by Alumni Malory Child.

Football

The Dirigo Football team won the Class C Maine state championship against Foxcroft Academy in 2009, with a record of 12-0.

Dirigo Football is currently being coached by Championship coach James Hersom.

Boys' basketball
The Boys' Basketball Team has been to 5 straight consecutive Western Maine Championship Games 2006-2011, winning in the 2009, 2010, 2011 seasons. They won the MVC Conference game in both 2008 and 2009.

The Boys' Basketball team beat Lee Academy 74-67 to win the 2012 State Championship.  This was their first State Championship since 1983 and their last until the 2021-2022 season as they defeated dexter 59-56

Boys' Basketball is currently being coached by Cody St. Germaine.

Dirigo won back to back State Championships in 2022 and 2023

Field hockey
Dirigos' field hockey team in the 2009 season made it to states for the first time in five years and had to compete against the number one seed of North Yarmouth Academy. Dirigo took up the sixth seed of the conference and played NYU but lost to them 0-10. Over-all the 2009 field hockey team achieved many of their set winning goals.
In 2015, Dirigo's field hockey team won the Mountain Valley Conference game against Oak Hill.

History of Dirigo tennis, boys' & girls'

Girls' Coach-Art Chamberlin 1981–present

Boys' Coach- Bruce Thompson 1977–present

Boys' Tennis MVC Champs 2006
Boys' Tennis MVC Champs 2007
Boys' Tennis MVS Champs 2008
Mountain Valley Champs-1988 through 1990 + 1993 +1998 +2001 + 2003
State Champs Class B 1983-1984

References

External links

Public high schools in Maine
Schools in Oxford County, Maine
Educational institutions established in 1948
1948 establishments in Maine